Dorcadiopsis planipennis is a species of beetle in the family Cerambycidae, and the only species in the genus Dorcadiopsis. It was described by Müller in 1941.

References

Morimopsini
Beetles described in 1941